Live – Big Music Tour 2015 is the fifth live album by Scottish rock band Simple Minds, released on 14 November 2015.

Overview
On 9 October 2015, Simple Minds announced the special exclusive Simpleminds.com release on 14 November 2015 of this 29-track double CD live album.

Release
Simple Minds confirmed that a digital download version would also be released.

Track listing

Notes

References

2015 live albums
Simple Minds live albums